Partition equilibrium is a special case of chemical equilibrium.  The most common chemical equilibrium systems involve reactants and products in the same phase - either all gases or all solutions. However, it is also possible to get equilibria between substances in different phases, such as two liquids that do not mix (are immiscible). Partition equilibria are described by Nernst's distribution law.

Example
For example, ammonia (NH3) is soluble in both water (aq) and the organic solvent trichloromethane (CHCl3) - two immiscible solvents.  If ammonia is first dissolved in water, and then an equal volume of trichloromethane is added, and the two liquids shaken together, the following equilibrium is established:
Kc = [NH3 (CHCl3)]/[NH3 (aq)]        (where Kc is the equilibrium constant)

The equilibrium concentrations of ammonia in each layer can be established by titration with standard acid solution. It can thus be determined that Kc remains constant, with a value of 0.4 in this case.

Partition coefficient

This particular kind of equilibrium constant measures how a substance distributes or partitions itself between two immiscible solvents. It is called the partition coefficient or distribution coefficient.

Polar and non-polar substances
Substances that are ionic or polar are more soluble in water than in non-polar organic solvents and vice versa.

Partition equilibrium chromatography
Partition equilibrium chromatography is a type of chromatography that is typically used in gas chromatography (GC) and high performance liquid chromatography (HPLC). The stationary phase in GC is a high boiling liquid bonded to solid surface and the mobile phase is a gas.

See also
Liquid–liquid extraction

Equilibrium chemistry
Chromatography
Gas chromatography